

Results

References

Mixed 10 m platform synchro